Napoleon's penis was allegedly amputated during an autopsy shortly after Napoleon's death in 1821. Since then it has passed through several owners, including A. S. W. Rosenbach, who exhibited it in New York City in 1927. It was purchased by John K. Lattimer in 1977, and is still held in his family, who keep it as a private item. It was described as  similar to a "piece of leather or a shriveled eel".

History 

Napoleon was exiled to Saint Helena in the Atlantic Ocean after losing the Battle of Waterloo. He died on the isle on May 5, 1821. After his death, an autopsy was conducted and Francesco Antommarchi, the doctor conducting the autopsy, cut his penis off, along with several other body parts. It is unclear whether the cut was intentional or accidental; Antommarchi may have been bribed to cut it off  by Napoleon's chaplain as revenge for Napoleon calling him "impotent".

The penis passed into the possession of Napoleon's chaplain, who smuggled it out of St. Helena to his home on Corsica. It remained in the priest's family until 1916 when Maggs Bros Ltd, a bookselling company based in London, purchased it. In 1924 A. S. W. Rosenbach, a Philadelphia-based bookseller, purchased it.

The penis went on display in 1927 at New York City's Museum of French Art. A reviewer present at the exhibition from Time described it as similar to a "maltreated strip of buckskin shoelace." Others present considered it to look like a "piece of leather or a shriveled eel". Rosenbach sold the item to a collector named Donald Hyde, whose wife gave it to John F. Fleming after Hyde's death. Fleming was a bookseller who had been close to Rosenbach. Another collector purchased it and attempted unsuccessfully to sell the penis at an auction through Christie's. After the auction, James Comyn was reading an affidavit about Eric LeVine, a collector of items relating to Napoleon, and instead of calling the item a "penis" euphemistically referred to it as a "certain part". A urologist and artifact collector named John K. Lattimer purchased the item in 1977 for $3,000 and it is currently owned by his daughter. She has been offered at least $100,000 for it.

Characteristics 
The preserved penis was described by Judith Pascoe in The New York Times as "barely recognizable as a human body part" and its authenticity is unclear. A documentary that aired on Channel 4, Dead Famous DNA, described it as "very small" and measured it to be . It is not known what size it was during Napoleon's lifetime. The item's current owner has allowed ten people to see it and it has never been recorded on camera.

References 

Penis
Body parts of individual people
Human penis
Victims of body snatching